Stockholm County held a county council election on 19 September 2010 on the same day as the general and municipal elections.

Results
There were 149 seats, the same number as in 2006. The Moderates became the largest party, winning 57 seats, a gain of two from the previous election. The party received about 36.7% of the overall vote of 1,254,844.

Municipal & Stockholm ward results
Stockholm Municipality was divided into six separate electoral wards (Södermalm-Enskede, Bromma-Kungsholmen, Norrmalm-Östermalm-Gamla Stan, Östra Söderort, Västra Söderort and Yttre Västerort) and its results were not counted as a unit. These wards have in these lists been translated to English to shorten columns.

References

Elections in Stockholm County
Stockholm